Make Mine Country is the fourth studio album by American country music singer Charley Pride, released in 1968 on RCA Records.

The album peaked at No. 4 on the Billboard Top Country Albums chart.

Track listing

Personnel
Charley Pride - vocals
Harold Bradley, Wayne Moss, William Irvin - guitar
Lloyd Green, Weldon Myrick - steel guitar
Roy M. "Junior" Huskey - bass
Hargus "Pig" Robbins - piano
Jerry Carrigan - drums
Recording engineer - Jim Malloy
Producers - Chet Atkins, Jack Clement, Bob Ferguson and Felton Jarvis

References

1968 albums
Charley Pride albums
Albums produced by Chet Atkins
Albums produced by Jack Clement
Albums produced by Bob Ferguson (music)
Albums produced by Felton Jarvis
RCA Records albums